Uni Air Flight 873 was a Taiwanese domestic passenger flight between Taipei and Hualien that suffered a fire following an explosion after landing at Hualien Airport, Taiwan, on 24 August 1999, resulting in 27 injuries and one death.

Accident 

Uni Air Flight 873 departed from Taipei Songshan Airport (TSA) bound for Hualien Airport (HUN). It was carrying 90 passengers and six crew. Shortly after landing, at 12:36 local time, an explosion was heard in the front section of the passenger cabin, followed by smoke and then fire. A passenger was struck by fragments produced by the explosion. The pilot braked immediately, and an emergency passenger evacuation was initiated. After a call for help to the tower by the pilot, fire squads at Hualien Airport and the Air Force Wing rushed to extinguish the fire, which was put out by 13:45 WST.

While the upper part of the fuselage was completely destroyed, all 96 of the occupants were evacuated. 14 passengers were seriously injured, while another 14 suffered minor injuries from the blast. Most of the injured passengers suffered burns. Ku Jing-chi, a passenger and the brother of former Taiwanese decathlete Ku Chin-shui, had serious injuries and died 47 days after the accident, while another passenger had a miscarriage of her 26-week-old fetus.

Investigation 
Following the accident, the Aviation Safety Council established an Accident Investigation Team. Initial findings revealed that the factors involved in the accident were not solely related to aviation safety. The investigation later revealed that Ku Chin-shui, who was absent from the flight, had given bottles of flammable liquid to his nephew to transport.

An Aviation Safety Council report said it was thought that the bottles were incorrectly sealed and gasoline fumes leaked, which later ignited when a motorbike battery in a nearby overhead luggage compartment was jostled, discharging an electric arc. Ku was initially sentenced to a 10-year prison term, which was shortened to  years upon appeal. The fifth retrial found him not guilty after the judge said that although Ku had asked his nephew to carry a bottle of bleach in his luggage, the fragments that tested positive for gasoline were not limited to the fragments of the bottle.

In popular culture 
The accident is featured in the third episode of Season 20 of Mayday, also known as Air Crash Investigation and Air Disasters. The episode is titled "Explosive Touchdown".

See also 
British Airtours Flight 28M, another aircraft fire on the ground
China Airlines Flight 120, another aircraft fire on the ground
ValuJet Airlines Flight 592, another accident involving hazardous materials on board igniting a fire
Air Canada Flight 797, another aircraft fire on the ground.
UPS Airlines Flight 6, another case where toxic materials, in this case damaged lithium-ion batteries, ignited a fire that brought down the flight.

References 

Aviation accidents and incidents in 1999
Aviation accidents and incidents in Taiwan
Hualien County
1999 in Taiwan
August 1999 events in Asia
Accidents and incidents involving the McDonnell Douglas MD-90
1999 disasters in Taiwan
Airliner accidents and incidents caused by in-flight fires